Lee Gwang-hoon  (born 26 November 1993) is a South Korean footballer who plays as a forward for Suwon FC in K League Classic.

Honours
Pohang Steelers
 Korean FA Cup Winner : 2012

South Korea
 AFC U-19 Championship Winner : 2012

External links 
 

1993 births
Living people
Association football forwards
South Korean footballers
Pohang Steelers players
Daejeon Hana Citizen FC players
Suwon FC players
K League 1 players
K League 2 players